The 1985 World Games were the second edition of the World Games, an international multi-sport event held in London. Three main venues were used, the main one being the Crystal Palace National Sports Centre. The opening ceremony was held at the Wembley Conference Centre. The master of ceremonies was television commentator Ron Pickering. Competitors were addressed by World Games Association President Dr Un Yong Kim, who told competitors, "the World Games is an innovation that deserves a warm welcome."  Games Patron Ryoichi Sasakawa underwrote the financial shortfall to enable the Games to take place. British Olympic Association Chairman Charles Palmer opened the Games on behalf of the British sports community.
The song "World Game" by John Denver was adopted as the theme for the Games. Sports included field archery, taekwondo, karate, sambo, powerlifting, finswimming, roller sports, casting, korfball, water skiing, speedway, fistball, softball and netball. 
The ground team at Crystal Palace was headed by former Nottingham Forest player Roy Dwight with assistance from Tosh Chamberlain. Television coverage was produced by Cheerleader productions. Commentators included Simon Reed, Martin Tyler, Gerald Sinstadt and Dave Lanning.

Titles
134 titles were awarded in 22 sports (not including two invitational sports).

 As Invitational sport

Venues included Wembley Conference Centre, Princes Club (Bedfont), Copthall Stadium. Wimbledon Stadium, Crystal Palace, David Lloyd Club, Tolmers Scout Camp and Stevenage Bowling Center.

Medal table
The medal tally during the second World Games is as follows. Italy finished at the top of the medal standings. Two bronze medals were awarded in fistball and in each karate-kumite (9) and taekwondo (8) event.

References
Channel Four broadcast of the Opening Ceremony.

External links
 Official Website of the IWGA
 Medal table at Sports123 (by Internet Archive)

 
1985
World Games
World Games
International sports competitions in London
1985 in English sport
Multi-sport events in the United Kingdom
World Games
World Games